Orphanopusia patriarchalis, common name the patriarchal mitre, is a species of sea snail, a marine gastropod mollusk, in the family Costellariidae, the ribbed miters.

Description
The shell size varies between 13 mm and 30 mm

Distribution
This marine species occurs n the Indian Ocean along the Seychelles and in the Pacific Ocean along Japan ,Hawaii and off Papua New Guinea.

References

 * Turner H. 2001. Katalog der Familie Costellariidae Macdonald, 1860. Conchbooks. 1–100-page(s): 49

External links
 Gmelin J.F. (1791). Vermes. In: Gmelin J.F. (Ed.) Caroli a Linnaei Systema Naturae per Regna Tria Naturae, Ed. 13. Tome 1(6). G.E. Beer, Lipsiae
 W.O.Cernohorsky, The Mitridae of Fiji - The Veliger v. 8 (1965-1966)

Costellariidae
Gastropods described in 1791